Head of the Armed Forces is the position of the sovereign of the United Kingdom as commander-in-chief of the British Armed Forces. However, supreme military authority has been delegated by the monarch to the Defence Council of the United Kingdom, a body officially charged with the direction and administration of the Armed Forces.

As the Council and other military bodies all are a part of the Defence Ministry, which itself is a part of the Government of the United Kingdom, the prime minister makes the key decisions on the use of the Armed Forces, while the secretary of state for defence assists the prime minister and administers the day-to-day military operations.

Military oath of allegiance
Before joining the military all recruits of the British Armed Forces (other than Ratings and Officers in the Royal Navy and Officers in the Royal Marines) must take the following oath: I... swear by Almighty God (do solemnly, and truly declare and affirm) that I will be faithful and bear true allegiance to His Majesty King Charles III, His Heirs and Successors, and that I will, as in duty bound, honestly and faithfully defend His Majesty, His Heirs and Successors, in Person, Crown and Dignity against all enemies, and will observe and obey all orders of His Majesty, His Heirs and Successors, and of the General Officers (Air Officers if entering the RAF) and officers set over me.Long-standing constitutional convention, however, has vested de facto executive authority, by the exercise of Royal Prerogative, in the Prime Minister and His Majesty's Secretary of State for Defence. The Prime Minister (acting with the Cabinet) makes the key political decisions on the use of the armed forces.

The King, however, remains the supreme authority of the military. As Commander-in-Chief the King closely follows developments in the armed forces and the security services. He regularly receives the agenda in advance of all cabinet meetings and its committees, particularly the national security committee. He also receives the minutes of the meetings of all of these committees and all cabinet documents.

The King regularly receives the Secretary of State for Defence in audience to discuss Defence documents and policies; if he requires, his Private Secretary can seek additional information from Defence departments. His Majesty also receives regular reports from the Chief of the General Staff, the First Sea Lord and Chief of the Naval Staff, and the Chief of Air Staff that cover all important developments in military matters. His Majesty further receives the Chief of the Defence Staff in audience to discuss tri-service military matters.

Duties and functions 

In his capacity as Commander in Chief of the Armed Forces the King exercises the following powers, duties and functions on the advice of His Majesty's Cabinet:

 Direct, control and govern the armed forces 
 Declare war, make peace or institute hostilities falling short of war
 Deploy and use the armed forces overseas
 Maintain the Royal Navy
 Deploy and use the armed forces on British soil to maintain peace and order in support of civilian government authorities (e.g. to maintain essential services during a strike)
 Order warships in times of urgent national necessity
 Commission all military officers
 Regulate trade with hostiles
 Engage in angary, in time of war, to appropriate the property of a neutral which is within the realm, where necessity requires
 Powers in the event of a grave national emergency, including those to enter upon, take and destroy private property

Defence Services Secretary of the Royal Household 
The Defence Services Secretary is an officer of the Royal Household. The DSS is appointed by Royal Warrant from the three Services on a rotational basis.  The current occupant is Rear Admiral James Norman Macleod. He is the primary channel of communication between the Monarch, in his capacity as Commander-in-Chief of the Armed Forces, and the officers and commands of the British Armed Forces. His office provides the Monarch with the information and documentation related to defence affairs that he requires to perform his military functions. The office was created in 1964 by Queen Elizabeth II as part of the centralization of military affairs into a single defence ministry. The DSS maintains a direct link with the offices of the chiefs of staff of the Army, Navy and Air Force. The Defence Services Secretary is responsible to the King, the Secretary of State for Defence and the Chief of the Defence Staff for tri-service military appointments and works with the Military Secretary, the Air Secretary and Naval Secretary. He submits the names of the officers nominated for promotion to the King through his private secretary. The King makes appointments to the ranks of rear-admiral, major-general, air vice-marshal and above directly.

The monarch and Military Appointments 
Under the Monarch's regulations for the Army, Navy and Air Force, the Monarch is responsible for making a large number of appointments to senior military posts. Currently the Commander-in-Chief approves appointments at the two-star level and up. The names of the officers appointed to these and other posts in the armed forces are regularly published by the Ministry of Defence.

Most military appointments are issued in the form of Letters Patent or a Royal Warrant, both are forms by which the royal will is expressed. The  Defence Council of United Kingdom is created by Letters Patent that also set out its powers and membership. The King signs a royal warrant directing the issue of the Letters Patent and ordering the Great Seal of The Realm to be affixed to them. Letters patent are the most formal method of appointment and are used infrequently.

The more frequent and simplest method of appointment is by Royal warrant signed by the Monarch and his Secretary of State for Defence. The Secretary of State first makes an informal submission of the name of a candidate, after the Monarch has signified his approval the Defence Ministry prepares the formal Warrant of Appointment. The Warrants (alongside all other Defence documentation) are sent at the end of each weekday to the King's Private Secretary by Dispatch box. The King and the Secretary of State for Defence then sign the warrant.

The monarch and the Ministry of Defence 
The Ministry of Defence is the highest level military headquarters charged with formulating and executing defence policy for the Armed Forces; it employed 57,000 civilians in October 2017.

The command authority of the Armed Forces flows from the monarch, in his capacity as commander-in-chief of the Armed Forces, to the various officers and councils of the defence ministry. The Monarch appoints the members of these committees to exercise day-to-day administration of His Majesty's Armed Forces. The committees are the Defence Council, the Army Board, the Navy Board, the Air Force Board, the Defence Board and the Chiefs of Staffs Committee. The Defence Council, composed of senior representatives of the services and the Ministry of Defence, provides the "formal legal basis for the conduct of defence" and is chaired by the Defence Secretary.

The monarch and the Naval, Military and Air Command Staffs 
Each service branch of the Armed Forces maintains its own command staff that administers the affairs of its service. The staffs receive their authority to act and to exercise command and control over their units from the monarch and his Defence Council.

Until 2012 each of the three services also had one or more commands with a (four-star) commander-in-chief in charge of operations. These were, latterly: Commander-in-Chief Fleet (CINCFLEET – sharing a Command HQ with Commander-in-Chief Naval Home Command (CINCNAVHOME)), Commander-in-Chief, Land Forces (CINCLAND) and Commander-in-Chief Air (CINCAIR). (At one time there were many more Naval, Military and Air Commands, each with (in many cases) their own Commanders-in-Chief.) Since 2012, however, full operational command has been vested in the three Chiefs of Staff, and the appointment of distinct Commanders-in-Chief has been discontinued. This change was implemented in response to the 2011 Levene report, which advised that it would serve to "streamline top-level decision-making, simplify lines of accountability... remove duplication between the posts and also provide impetus to the leaning of the senior leadership".

See also 
 Colonel-in-Chief
 Commander-in-chief
 British Empire

References 

British Armed Forces
British monarchy
Government of the United Kingdom
Commanders in chief